Karl Erik Nils Lindén (8 November 1911 – 22 December 1992) was a Swedish  freestyle wrestler who won a bronze medal in the middleweight division at the 1948 Summer Olympics in London.

References

Wrestlers at the 1948 Summer Olympics
Swedish male sport wrestlers
1911 births
1992 deaths
Olympic medalists in wrestling
Medalists at the 1948 Summer Olympics
Olympic bronze medalists for Sweden
Sportspeople from Malmö
20th-century Swedish people